Quacks, created by James Wood, is a BBC sitcom about four Victorian era doctors. The series combines satire, absurdist comedy and traditional slapstick, with stories often being based on real history. Despite generally favourable reviews it was cancelled after one series.

Cast

Main characters
Rory Kinnear as Robert Lessing, a showman surgeon who smokes cigarettes and wears a filthy bloodstained apron when performing operations before a public audience.
Lydia Leonard as Caroline, Robert's professionally- and sexually-frustrated wife.
Mathew Baynton as William, an  alienist (an early psychiatrist) and Robert's best friend.
Tom Basden as John, a dentist and early anaesthetist who experiments freely with drugs and owes money to a loan shark.
Rupert Everett as Dr Hendricks, the paranoid and anti-Semitic principal of the medical school.

Recurring characters
Andy Linden as Fitz, the old warder at the lunatic asylum.
Adam Ewan as Tom, Robert's working class assistant.
Osi Okerafor as Butterworth, a debt collector who routinely threatens and assaults John.
Lisa Jackson as Mina, William's fiancée.
Miranda Hennesey as Nicola, John's lover.
Selina Griffiths as a Matron
Geoffrey McGivern as Landlord
Ed Gaughan as Peters

One-off characters
Millie Thomas as Florence Nightingale.
Andrew Scott as Charles Dickens.
Roger Ashton-Griffiths as the Bishop of Lambeth. 
Nicholas Blane as the Duke of Bedford.
Fenella Woolgar as Lady Campbell.
Kayvan Novak as Mr Kapoor, an Indian restaurant owner who moonlights as a hypnotist.
Simon Farnaby as Dr Flowers, purveyor of liniments and lotions.
Ben Willbond as Patrice Dupont, a renowned surgeon.

Episodes

Production
Chatham Dockyard in Kent doubled as streets of Victorian London. It was also used as the location of the apothecary and bareknuckle boxing fight featured in the series.

Critical response
The series has received positive reviews, with many critics comparing it with Blackadder.

The first episode, which aired on BBC 2 at 10pm on 15 August 2017, received positive reviews from The Independent and The Guardian. Critics like Gerard Gilbert praised the series' originality, and particularly the performance of Lydia Leonard and Rupert Everett.  Radio Times noted the similarities to Monty Python and Blackadder, and praised the scriptwriters' ability to weave the series' surreal humour with anecdotes of bizarre real historical events. Reviews generally remained favourable by the time the final series episode aired, with Sean O'Grady of The Independent calling for a second series.

References

External links
 
 
 
 

2017 British television series debuts
2017 British television series endings
2010s British medical television series
2010s British sitcoms
BBC high definition shows
BBC medical television shows
BBC television sitcoms
English-language television shows
Television series set in the 1840s
Television shows set in London